Eleven referendums were held in Switzerland during 2003. The first two were held on 9 February on federal resolutions on reforming the referendum process and changing the cantonal contribution to financing hospital medication. Both were approved. The last nine were all held on 18 May on two federal laws on the Swiss army and civil defence, and seven popular initiatives; "yes to fair rents", "for one Sunday a season free from motor vehicles–a test for four years", "health has to be affordable", "equal rights for the disabled", "electricity without nuclear power", "for prolonging the ban on new nuclear power stations" and "for a sufficient provision of vocational education". Whilst the two laws were approved, all nine initiatives were rejected by voters.

Results

See also 
 Anti-nuclear movement in Switzerland

References

2003 elections in Switzerland
2003 referendums
Referendums in Switzerland